The 1987 Bucknell Bison football team was an American football team that represented Bucknell University during the 1987 NCAA Division I-AA football season. Bucknell finished second-to-last in the Colonial League.

In their second year under head coach George Landis, the Bison compiled a 4–5–1 record. Jim Given and Greg Schiano were the team captains.

The Bison were outscored 259 to 248. Bucknell's 1–3–1 conference record placed fifth in the six-team Colonial League standings.

Bucknell played its home games at Memorial Stadium on the university campus in Lewisburg, Pennsylvania.

Schedule

References

Bucknell
Bucknell Bison football seasons
Bucknell Bison football